{{Infobox film
| name           = Saloon Bar
| image          = Saloon Bar.jpg
| caption        =
| director       = Walter Forde
| producer       = Michael Balcon  Culley Forde 
| based_on = Saloon Bar by Frank Harvey 
| writer         = John Dighton Angus MacPhail 
| narrator       =
| starring       = Gordon Harker  Elizabeth Allan Mervyn Johns
| music          = Ernest Irving
| cinematography = Ronald Neame
| editing        = Ray Pitt
| studio = Ealing Studios
| distributor    =Associated British Film Distributors
| released       = November 2, 1940
| runtime        = 76 minutes
| country        = United Kingdom
| language       = English
| budget         =
| gross          =
}}Saloon Bar is a 1940 British thriller film directed by Walter Forde and starring Gordon Harker, Elizabeth Allan and Mervyn Johns. It was made by Ealing Studios and its style has led to comparisons with the later Ealing Comedies, unlike other wartime Ealing films which are different in tone.
The action takes place over one evening in the saloon bar of a London pub, just before Christmas. The regulars discuss the forthcoming execution for robbery and murder of the boyfriend of one of the barmaids. A pound note from the robbery is found in the till. Convinced of the condemned man's innocence they trace how the note came to be there and  manage to unmask the true killer.

It is based on the 1939 play of the same name by Frank Harvey in which Harker had also starred. The film's sets were designed by the art director Wilfred Shingleton.

 Plot 
An amateur detective tries to clear an innocent man of a crime before the date of his execution.

 Cast 

Gordon Harker as Joe Harris
Elizabeth Allan as Queenie
Mervyn Johns as Wickers
Joyce Barbour as Sally
Anna Konstam as Ivy
Cyril Raymond as Harry Small
Judy Campbell as Doris
Al Millen as Fred
Norman Pierce as Bill Hoskins
Alec Clunes as Eddie Graves
Mavis Villiers as Joan
Felix Aylmer as Mayor
O. B. Clarence as Sir Archibald
Aubrey Dexter as Major
Helena Pickard as Mrs Small
Manning Whiley as Evangelist
Laurence Kitchin as Peter
Roddy Hughes as Doctor
Gordon James as Jim
Annie Esmond as Mrs. Truscott
Eliot Makeham as Meek Man
Roddy McDowall as Boy
 Julie Suedo as 	Eleanor 
 Torin Thatcher as 	Mr. Garrod 

References

Bibliography
 Murphy, Robert. Realism and Tinsel: Cinema and Society in Britain 1939-48''. Routledge, 1992.

External links 

1940 films
1940s thriller films
British black-and-white films
British films based on plays
Ealing Studios films
British detective films
Films set in London
British thriller films
Films directed by Walter Forde
1940s English-language films
1940s British films